The Damascus–Amman train or Damascus–Amman railway is an international train service operating on the former Hedjaz Railway from Damascus, Syria to Amman, Jordan. It is currently the only passenger train operating in Jordan.

History
The Hedjaz Railway opened in 1908 by the Ottoman Empire from Damascus to Medina. Service was suspended during World War I. After the war only the Damascus-Ma'an section re-opened. In 1924, the International Train ran its first trip from Hejaz Train Station in Damascus to Ma'an. Since 1960 the train only ran from Damascus to Amman. Diesel Locomotives became the primary power after 1976.

Gauge 
In 2008 it was announced that the HJR and the CFH were planning to convert the line from narrow gauge to standard gauge.

See also
Hejaz railway
Syrian Railways, the state railway operation

International named passenger trains
Rail transport in Syria
Rail transport in Jordan
Hejaz railway
Jordan–Syria relations